Beacon Hill is a hill and neighborhood in southeast Seattle, Washington. It is roughly bounded on the west by Interstate 5, on the north by Interstate 90, on the east by Rainier Avenue South, Cheasty Boulevard South, and Martin Luther King Junior Way South, and on the south by the Seattle city boundary. It is part of Seattle's South End.

The neighborhood has a major population of Asian Americans and African Americans and is among the most racially diverse in Seattle. It was formerly home to the world headquarters of Amazon (at the Pacific Tower) and present home to the Seattle Division of the Department of Veterans Affairs' Puget Sound Health Care System.

Geography

Beacon Hill offers views of downtown, the Industrial District, Elliott Bay, First Hill, Rainier Valley, and, when the weather is good, Mount Rainier and the Olympic Mountains. It is roughly bounded on the west by Interstate 5, on the north by Interstate 90, on the east by Rainier Avenue South, Cheasty Boulevard South, and Martin Luther King Junior Way South, and on the south by the Seattle city boundary. It is part of Seattle's South End.

The municipal government subdivides it into North Beacon Hill, Mid-Beacon Hill, Holly Park, and South Beacon Hill, though most people who live there simply call it "Beacon Hill."

Homes on the northern part of the hill were mostly built in the early 1900s; thus, North Beacon Hill contains many examples of Craftsman bungalows and Seattle box houses, a local variant of the Foursquare style.

Nearby neighborhoods
 Columbia City
 Georgetown
 Industrial District (see also  SoDo)
 International District/Chinatown
 Judkins Park
 Mount Baker
 Rainier Valley
 Rainier Beach
 SoDo

History and demographics

The Duwamish call the hill "Greenish-Yellow Spine" (Lushootseed: qWátSéécH, pronounced QWAH-tseech), probably referring to the color of the deciduous trees that once grew thickly on the hill. Early settlers named it Holgate and Hanford Hill after two early settlers, John Holgate and Edward Hanford, who settled in the area in the 1850s and are commemorated to this day by South Holgate and Hanford Streets on North Beacon Hill. A later arrival, M. Harwood Young, named the hill after the Beacon Hill in his hometown, Boston, Massachusetts.

Beacon Hill was nicknamed "Boeing Hill" in the 1950s and 60s due to the number of residents who worked in the nearby Boeing airplane factory.  The term fell out of use when many Boeing employees joined the general exodus to the suburbs, and Asian immigrants took their place.  Today the neighborhood is majority Asian, as can be seen by the many Chinese, Vietnamese, and Filipino businesses along Beacon Avenue South. However, the area remains racially diverse, as shown by the  2000 United States census:  51% Asian, 20% white, 13% black, 9% Hispanic/Latino and 7% other.  The census also showed the total Beacon Hill population to be 22,300.  Neighboring Rainier Valley also shows a similar diversity.

Landmarks and institutions

 Pacific Medical Center (PacMed) located at the northern tip of Beacon Hill. Formerly a marine hospital, the building served as headquarters to Amazon for ten years.
 Jefferson Park: Golf, lawn bowling, skate park, Beacon Mountain Playground, tennis courts, open space and more. Golf professional Fred Couples was raised in the neighborhood and Jefferson Park was his home course as a teen. 
 Beacon Food Forest is one of the nation's largest food forest projects and is located on the west side of Jefferson Park.
 Comet Lodge Cemetery (1895)
 Dr. Jose Rizal Park: views to the west overlooking downtown, Elliott Bay and Olympic Mountains; start of bike path to I-90 bridge, Lake Washington, Mercer Island, Eastgate
 El Centro de la Raza, a civil rights and community service organization, in the former Beacon Hill School built in 1904
  Beacon Hill First Baptist Church a historic landmark Tudor Revival building built in 1910, designed by notable architect Ellsworth Storey 
 The Frank D. Black property a designated landmark with river rock structures built in 1914  
 Cheasty Greenbelt/Cheasty Boulevard Trail
 Beacon Hill Station of Sound Transit Light Rail, located at Beacon Avenue South and South Lander Street
 Beacon Hill branch of the Seattle Public Library, reopened in a new building and location in 2005
 Beacon Hill International Elementary School, a K-5 school that offers bilingual and diverse programs
 Daejeon Park

Awards and honors

In 2012, the American Planning Association named Beacon Hill as one of the 30 Great Places in America.

Culture

The Beacon Hill neighborhood prides itself on many fine foods and restaurants, a highly rated hair salon, the best live music venue, and a place for kids activities, all voted for as some of the "Best of 2012" by Seattle Magazine (online version not currently available). The City of Seattle, in partnership with Beacon BIKES, created the Beacon Hill Family Bicycle and Pedestrian Circulation Plan, a ten-year plan to increase pedestrian bicycle networks serving highly used greenways, intersections, and cycle tracts within the neighborhood as a measure to increase safety for all users. The plan was awarded the 2012 VISION 2040 Award from the Puget Sound Regional Council.

Beacon Hill is home to the "Beacon Rocks!" performance series, beginning its 5th season in 2014 on the last Sunday of June, July and August. This event featuring a variety of types of performances is held on the Roberto Maestas Festival Street and produced by Beacon Hill's neighborhood community arts group "ROCKiT Community Arts".

Beacon Hill has recently become known for their Food Forest, a new project that has created neighborhood urban farming west of Jefferson Park. The Beacon Food Forest has gained national attention in the news, receiving recognition from the Associated Press, CBS, Gawker, and HLN, to name a few. A 2012 article in Seattle Weekly stated that Beacon Hill was soon to "boast the biggest public food forest in the country" with seven lush acres containing a community park and an edible landscape, including such plantings as walnuts, chestnuts, berry shrubs and vegetables. The idea started with a community-led group that secured $22,000 in Neighborhood Matching Funds from the Department of Neighborhoods.

Further reading
 Merrell, Frederica and Mira Latoszek (2004). Seattle's Beacon Hill (Images of America). Charleston: Arcadia Publishing. .

References

External links

 North Beacon Hill Neighborhood Council
 Seattle City Neighborhood Map of Beacon Hill
 South Beacon Hill Neighborhood Council